Jeepney TV is a 24-hour Philippine pay television channel owned and operated by ABS-CBN's narrowcast arm Creative Programs Inc. since 2012. The programming consists of classic and archived series and programs previously aired on ABS-CBN. The channel is named after the jeepney, an automotive vehicle that has been widely used as a transportation in the Philippines since World War II. A video on demand service for Jeepney TV shows are available worldwide via iWantTFC and TFC IPTV.

History
In 2015, the channel revamped its graphics and program line-up, and the programming schedule was overhauled yet again.<ref>[https://www.youtube.com/watch?v=vGY_85CWNSQ Sizzle Reel: Jeepney TV On-Air Graphics Re-brand (2015)], Caven Studios Inc., January 11, 2016</ref>

In March 2018, Jeepney TV featured the Hero Zone (a former anime block of ABS-CBN's main channel in 2006) as a two-hour weekend morning anime block, beginning with Yu-Gi-Oh! Arc-V and KonoSuba''.

In July 2018, Jeepney TV became available on ABS-CBN TVplus for a free trial basis until its franchise expiration on May 5, 2020.

On June 1, 2020, Jeepney TV temporarily took over ABS-CBN's channel space for ABS-CBN TVplus users due to its franchise being expired, along with Asianovela Channel, which also took over S+A's channel space.

On June 30, 2020, Jeepney TV suspended broadcasting on both ABS-CBN TV Plus and Sky Direct due to the alias cease and desist order by the National Telecommunications Commission in connection with the expiration of ABS-CBN franchise.  However, Jeepney TV continues to broadcast on Sky Cable and other cable television providers.

On August 1, 2020, it officially livestreams some of its contents along with Kapamilya Channel on the online video-sharing platforms Facebook and YouTube as part of Kapamilya Online Live.

The channel was made available on G Sat Channel 55 on October 5, 2020, SatLite Channel 37 on November 19, 2020  and Cignal Channel 44 on January 4, 2021, replacing the channel space of Fox Filipino.

Programming

See also
 Kapamilya Channel
 A2Z
 Fox Filipino
 Heart of Asia Channel
 One Screen (defunct)
 Pinoy Hits
 Sari-Sari Channel
 BuKo

References

External links

ABS-CBN Corporation channels
Assets owned by ABS-CBN Corporation
Classic television networks
Creative Programs
Filipino-language television stations
Television networks in the Philippines
Television channels and stations established in 2012
2012 establishments in the Philippines